This is a list of all known microquasars:

1

1E 1740,7-2942

4

4U1630-47

C

Cygnus X-1
Cygnus X-3 (V1521)
CI Cam

G

GRS 1915+105
GRO J1655-40
GX339-4

K

KS1731-260

L

LS I +61 303
LS 5039

S

Scorpius X-1
SS 433

V

V4641 Sgr
V691 CrA

X

XMMU J004243.6+412519
XTE J1118+480
XTE J1550-564

See also 

 List of quasars

References

microquasars